"Inside of Me" is the twelfth single by Vamps released on August 31, 2016. This is the second single from the album Underworld.

The single was created and recorded overseas, in the United States, and produced by Howard Benson.

The title-track features Chris Motionless, lead singer of the American metalcore band Motionless in White. The coupling track on the single Rise or Die also features another renowned name, with the guitarist of German industrial metal band Rammstein, Richard Z. Kruspe, lending his guitar and composing skills for the song. Kruspe had originally written and demoed the song for his side project Emigrate. Vamps heard it and thought it would be a good song for them and asked him if they could use it.

The single reached number 7 on the Oricon chart.

Track listing

References

2016 singles
Japanese rock songs